Uncontrolled Substance is the debut studio album by rapper and Wu-Tang Clan member Inspectah Deck. The album was released on October 5, 1999, under Loud Records. Originally slated for release in 1995, the record was indefinitely postponed after a flood destroyed over 100 beats in RZA's basement, including his original productions for the album. Eventually released four years later, Uncontrolled Substance received mostly positive reviews, and is Inspectah Deck's most critically acclaimed and most commercially successful album to date. The album features Wu-Tang Clan members U-God and Masta Killa, and appearances from lesser-known affiliates Street Life, Killa Sin, and LA the Darkman. A music video was made for the songs "Word on the Street" directed by Gregory Dark & "Show 'N' Prove" directed by Joseph Kahn. The album's liner notes state that it is dedicated to Inspectah Deck's late father, Frank Hunter.

Commercial performance 

The album reached the positions no. 19 and no. 3 on the  Billboard 200 and the Top R&B/Hip-Hop Albums charts, respectively. According to Inspectah Deck himself, the album managed to reach gold-level sales.

Track listing

Personnel

The RZA – executive producer, producer
Mitchell "Divine" Diggs – executive producer, executive supervisor
Jeff Trotter – A&R direction
Ashuanna Ayers – project coordinator
Che Harris – A&R coordinator
Charlene Thomas – A&R coordinator
Chris Gehringer – mastering, recording
Girard Hunt – marketing
Jeff Swierk – marketingtety
Maurice Whitaker – creative direction, design, layout
Piotr Sikora – photography
Inspectah Deck – producer, mixing
Allah Mathematics – producer

Nolan Moffitte – recording, mixing
4th Disciple – producer
Djini Brown – recording, mixing
V.I.C. – producer, mixing
Gabe Chiesa – recording
True Master – producer
Tony Black – mixing, recording
Pete Rock – producer, mixing
Brian Stanley – recording
Large Professor – mixing
The Blaquesmiths – producers
Chris "CHAMP" Champions – recording

Charts

References 

1999 debut albums
Inspectah Deck albums
Loud Records albums
Albums produced by True Master
Albums produced by Mathematics
Albums produced by RZA
Albums produced by 4th Disciple